Dasymetopa is a genus of picture-winged flies in the family Ulidiidae.

Species
 Dasymetopa fenestrata
 Dasymetopa fuscicosta
 Dasymetopa luteipennis
 Dasymetopa ochracea
 Dasymetopa quinquepunctata
 Dasymetopa septempunctata
 Dasymetopa sordida

References

 
Ulidiidae